Zow may refer to:
 Zu, North Khorasan, a village in North Khorasan Province, Iran
 Zu-ye Olya, a village in North Khorasan Province, Iran
 Zu-ye Sofla (disambiguation)
 Zaav, a legendary king of Iran

See also
ZOW